Weeke is an ecclesiastical parish, based around St Matthew's Church, is an ecclesiastical parish to the north-west of Winchester, Hampshire, England.

References

History of Winchester